Defending champion David Wagner and his partner Sam Schröder defeated the other defending champion Dylan Alcott and his partner Andy Lapthorne in the final, 4–6, 7–5, [10–8] to win the quad doubles wheelchair tennis title at the 2020 French Open.

Alcott and Wagner and were the defending champions  but did not participate together.

Draw

Finals

References

External links
 Draw

Wheelchair Quad Singles
French Open, 2020 Quad Singles